Messianic primarily means "of the Messiah"  or "A Follower of the Messiah", a religious savior in Abrahamic religions 

It may also refer to:
 Messianism, belief in a Messiah, savior or redeemer 
 Messiah in Judaism
 Messiah in Christianity
 Messiah in Islam

Religious movements
Church of World Messianity, a new religious movement in Brazil and Japan
Messianic Judaism, a religious movement incorporating elements of Judaism with the tenets of Christianity
Chabad messianism, a religious movement asserting that a leader of the Chabad-Lubavitch movement is or was the Jewish messiah

See also
Messiah (disambiguation)
Messianic Age
 False Messiah 
 Antichrist
Jesus and Messianic prophecy
Jewish Christian
 Messianic complex, a psychological state of mind
 Totalitarian democracy, also known as Messianic democracy, a democracy where voting is a citizens only right
 Olivier Messiaen, a French composer, organist, and ornithologist